is a retired Japanese actor. Before his retirement, Machida had appeared more than 150 films, including many yakuza films produced by Toei. When he was a child , he became Mas Oyama's pupil. Now he is advisor of International Karate Organization Kyokushin-kaikan.

Filmography

Film
Kurenai no Tsubasa (1958)
Kunoichi ninpō (1964)
Abashiri Prison (1965)
Zoku Soshiki Bōryoku (1967)
Zatoichi and the Fugitives (1968) as Ogano Genpachiro
Outlaw: Gangster VIP (1968) as Sugiyama Katsuhiko
The Valiant Red Peony (1969)
Bloodstained Clan Honor (1970)
Soshiki Bōryoku Kyōdaisakazuki (1971)
Street Mobster (1972)
The Yakuza (1975) as Kato Jiro
Wolf Guy: Burning Wolf Man  (1975)
The Resurrection of the Golden Wolf (1979)
The Go Masters (1983)
Saigo no Bakuto (1985)

Television
Edo no KazePart2 (1976) (ep. 11, guest)
Edo no Uzu (1978) (ep. 9, guest)
Daitsuiseki (1978) (ep. 14, guest)
Seibu Keisatsu (1979) (ep. 5 & 12, guest)
Shishi no Jidai (1981) (Taiga drama) as Detective Ueda
Sanada Taiheiki (1985–86) as Ban Naganobu

References

External links

1936 births
Japanese male film actors
Japanese male television actors
20th-century Japanese male actors
Japanese male stage actors
Japanese male child actors
Living people
Actors from Chiba Prefecture
People from Chiba (city)